T-ara is a South Korean girl group formed by MBK Entertainment in 2009, consists of four members: Qri, Eunjung, Hyomin and Jiyeon. T-ara's career is marked by hook-heavy dance-pop music, a result of their close partnership with composer Shinsadong Tiger. A broad array of visual concepts have earned the group a "chameleon-like" reputation. The group has achieved commercial success in several regions in Asia including South Korea and China, with their 2011 single "Roly-Poly" being one of the most downloaded domestic singles since 2010.

T-ara made their debut in July 2009 with the single "Lie", following line-up changes due to creative differences; their debut studio album Absolute First Album was released in December 2009 to critical and commercial success, and spawned the hit singles "TTL (Time to Love)", "Bo Peep Bo Peep", and "You Drive Me Crazy". Both their debut Japanese single and studio album reached number one on the Oricon weekly charts and were subsequently certified Gold. They subsequently gained nationwide recognition after releasing "Roly-Poly" in 2011, which went on to become the Gaon chart's best-selling single of the year. At the height of K-pop's popularity in Japan, T-ara signed onto management agency J-Rock for $4.7 million—reportedly the highest figure of any Korean girl group expanding into the territory at the time. T-ara's late-2011 Korean release Black Eyes spawned three consecutive number ones: "Cry Cry", "We Were in Love" and "Lovey-Dovey".

In 2012, T-ara experienced a dip in popularity as the group faced accusations of internal discord, resulting in Hwayoung's immediate departure with Areum following a year after. T-ara's later material was released to varying degrees of success before the group began focusing on promotional activities in China, where they attracted attention for their cover of Chopstick Brothers' "Little Apple" in 2014. T-ara's final release as six members was tentatively scheduled for May 2017, ahead of Soyeon and Boram's expiring contracts; however, conflicts with their management delayed What's My Name? until June 2017, effectively ending their involvement. Qri, Eunjung, Hyomin and Jiyeon had previously extended their terms with MBK Entertainment until December 31, 2017.

On January 3, 2018, T-ara went on an indefinite hiatus in order to allow the members to pursue their solo careers.  T-ara reunited after four years and released their first independent album, Re:T-ara, in November 2021.

History

2009–2010: Formation, debut and Absolute First Album
The original pre-debut five T-ara members (Jiae, Jiwon, Eunjung, Hyomin and Jiyeon) trained together for three years under Mnet Media. The meaning behind the group's name, which is based on the word "tiara", comes from the idea that they will become the "queens of the music industry". In April 2009, they released their first song "Joheun Saram (Ver. 1)" ("Good Person") for the Cinderella Man soundtrack. Jiyeon teamed up with labelmates SeeYa and Davichi for a collaboration single titled "Yeoseong Shidae" ("Women's Generation"), which was released in May 2009.

In June 2009, Mnet Media announced that Jiae and Jiwon would be leaving T-ara due to differences in music style. The first new member to be added to the group was Boram, the daughter of singer Jeon Young-rok and actress Lee Mi-young. Soyeon, a former trainee of SM Entertainment who was supposed to be the leader of Girls' Generation, and Qri were added to T-ara three weeks prior to debut. In early July 2009, the group was moved from Mnet Media to its subsidiary company Core Contents Media.

T-ara made their debut on MBC's Radio Star talk show on July 29, 2009. Their first performance was on Mnet's M Countdown music show on July 30, where they performed "Geojitmal" ("Lies") and "Norabollae?" ("Wanna Play?") from their debut single. Their debut was looked upon negatively by webpostings, where people stated that it was lipsynched and commented that it seemed like an "elementary school" performance. The group announced afterwards that future performances would be live. In September 2009, Eunjung, Soyeon, Hyomin and Jiyeon collaborated with labelmates Kwangsu, Jihyuk, and Geonil of Supernova for the single "TTL (Time to Love)". It was released on September 15, 2009, and became both groups' first number one song as it topped many of the online charts. T-ara and Supernova collaborated again for "TTL Listen 2", a sequel to "TTL (Time to Love)", which was released on October 9, 2009, and included all the members from both groups.

T-ara released their debut studio album, Absolute First Album, on November 27, 2009. In order to determine the album's title track, Core Contents Media held a survey in which the public had to choose between "Bo Peep Bo Peep" or "Cheoeum Cheoreom" ("Like the First Time"). 9,000 people took the survey on various music portals with 53% (4,770 people) choosing "Cheoeum Cheoreom" over "Bo Peep Bo Peep". However, the latter was promoted on music shows instead for unknown reasons. "Bo Peep Bo Peep" peaked at number four on the Gaon chart, while "Cheoeum Cheoreom" peaked at number ten. They held their comeback performance on Music Bank on December 4, 2009. At the 24th Golden Disk Awards, T-ara was awarded Rookie of the Year along with girl group 4minute.

The group won their first-ever music show award with "Bo Peep Bo Peep" on the New Year's Day episode of Music Bank. The song went on to win five awards in total: two on Music Bank and three on Inkigayo, earning them a "Triple Crown". Later in January 2010, the group announced promotions for their follow up single, "Cheoeum Cheoreom", which ended quickly as Soyeon was diagnosed with H1N1. The same month, T-ara made a cameo appearance on the seventh and eight episodes of God of Study, in which Jiyeon played a main role.

In February 2010, the group announced a re-release of their debut album under the title Breaking Heart. The two lead singles, "Neo Ttaemune Michyeo" ("I Go Crazy Because of You") and "Naega Neomu Apa" ("I'm Really Hurt"), were digitally released on February 23, 2010, and peaked at number one and number thirty-one on the Gaon chart, respectively.
T-ara held their comeback performance on the same day on M Countdown, and won several music awards for "Neo Ttaemune Michyeo" over the course of their promotions: two consecutive Mutizen wins on Inkigayo and one first place award on M Countdown. Breaking Heart was released physically on March 3, 2010, peaking at number two on the weekly Gaon chart and number thirty-five on the yearly chart; selling 40,695 copies. After promotions for "Neo Ttaemune Michyeo" ended, T-ara performed "Naega Neomu Apa" on music shows until early April 2010. In June 2010, the group donated all the proceeds of the World Cup merchandise sold on their online clothing shop T-ara Dot Com to a charity for African children. On July 16, 2010, T-ara representatives announced the addition of Hwayoung Ryu as the seventh member of the group. The reason given was that with so many solo projects, they would be able to have a more complete lineup for T-ara when individual members were filming or doing other appearances. They also stated that it would allow the members to undertake more solo activities, and would give them all some relief from their heavy schedules.

In November 2010, the group was in the third season of the reality show Hello Baby, in which they took care of Moon Mason and his two brothers. T-ara released the digital download for "Wae Ireoni" ("Why Are You Being Like This"), the lead single for their first extended play, Temptastic, on November 23, 2010.
Temptastic was released in digital format on December 1, 2010, along with their second single, "Yayaya". The album's physical release was delayed until December 3 due to the bombardment of Yeonpyeong earlier in November 2010.
T-ara held their first comeback performance through Music Bank on December 3 and began promotions with their new seventh member, Hwayoung, and new leader, Boram, and received two consecutive wins for "Wae Ireoni" and "Yayaya" on M Countdown.

2011–2012: Breakthrough and bullying controversy

T-ara's second EP John Travolta Wannabe was released on June 29, 2011. It charted at number three on the Gaon Album Chart and has sold 30,116 copies as of 2011. The EP's only single, "Roly-Poly", peaked at number two on the Gaon Digital Chart and number one on the Korea K-Pop Hot 100 chart. The single became a breakthrough success, becoming the top-grossing and highest-selling single of 2011 in South Korea with over four digital million units sold. "Roly-Poly" was awarded Best Music Video at the 3rd Melon Music Awards and Singer of the Year (July) at the 1st Gaon Chart Awards, and was nominated Best Dance Performance by a Female Group and Song of the Year at the 13th Mnet Asian Music Awards.

The group released a limited edition re-issue of John Travolta Wannabe, titled Roly-Poly in Copacabana, on August 2, 2011. The title track, "Roly-Poly in Copacabana", is a eurodance remix of "Roly-Poly", named after the song "Copacabana" which was popularized in the 80's in Jongno disco clubs. The album peaked at number three, while the single peaked at number forty and forty-five on the Gaon and Billboard Korea K-Pop Hot 100 charts. The group began follow up promotions for the remixed single on Music Bank. T-ara released their debut Japanese single "Bo Peep Bo Peep" on September 28, which peaked at number one on the Oricon weekly singles chart with over  copies sold, making them the first non-Japanese girl group to rank at number one for a debut single in Oricon history. The single peaked at number one on the Billboard Japan Hot 100, and was certified Gold by the RIAJ for both full-length cellphone downloads and PC downloads.

In November 2011, T-ara released their third extended play Black Eyes which charted at number two on the Gaon charts. The album was preceded by the release of "Cry Cry", which peaked at number one on the Billboard Korea K-Pop Hot 100 and won two consecutive first-place awards on M Countdown. The music video for "Cry Cry" was noted for having a billion Korean won production budget and a thirty-minute drama story line. The group released their second Japanese single, a remake of "Yayaya" from their Temptastic EP, on November 30. The single peaked at number seven on the Oricon charts and number six on the Billboard Japan Hot 100.

In December 2011, Core Contents Media announced that T-ara's third leader Hyomin would be passing on her leadership to Soyeon. The group performed a three-day mini-concert tour titled X-mas Premium Live, that was held at the Shinagawa Stella Hall in Tokyo, the Zepp in Nagoya, and the Zepp in Osaka. T-ara rose to become the second biggest girl group in Korea in 2011 by ranking at number eight on the Gallup Korea poll. T-ara and Davichi released their Christmastide ballad, "Uri Saranghaetjanha" ("We Were in Love") on December 23, 2011; it was later included on T-ara's Funky Town re-release album. The single reached number one on the Gaon Chart and peaked at number two on the Billboard Korea K-Pop Hot 100. Both groups performed the song weekly on SBS's Inkigayo in the midst of T-ara's heavy preparations for their year-end ceremonies.

T-ara re-released Black Eyes under the title Funky Town on January 3, 2012. The album peaked at number one on the Gaon weekly album chart and number two on the monthly album chart, selling 76.749 copies. "Lovey-Dovey" was released as the second single from the album, which peaked at number one on both the Gaon and Billboard Korea K-pop Hot 100 charts. The single has sold more than 3 million digital copies in South Korea alone. In February, Forbes Korea, in celebration of their ninth year of establishment, reported the year's list of the "Top 40 Power Celebrities". T-ara ranked on the list at number seventeen, thus making them as the third most powerful girl group and the seventh most powerful female celebrity in Korea.

In April, Core Contents Media announced that two new members were to be added to T-ara's line-up in July, thus transforming T-ara into a nine-member group. On May 30, 2012, 14-year-old Dani was announced as one of the group's new members. She later starred in the drama version of T-ara's "Day by Day" music video. However, as of August 2016, Dani is still a trainee and has not debuted as a member of T-ara. On June 14, 2012, Core Contents Media introduced 18-year-old Areum as the new maknae (youngest member) and last of the group's two new additions.

The group released their first Japanese album Jewelry Box on June 6, 2012. The album debuted at number two on the Oricon weekly albums chart with sales of over 57,000 copies. They embarked on their first Japanese concert tour T-ara Japan Tour 2012: Jewelry Box in Nagoya on June 19; the tour's attendance was expected to exceed 40,000 people. Four singles had been released prior to the album: "Bo Peep Bo Peep", "Yayaya", "Roly-Poly" and "Lovey-Dovey". On July 3, T-ara released their fourth extended play, Day by Day, which charted at number five on the Gaon chart. The title track, "Day by Day", was released as a single on the same day, peaking at number two. The first comeback performance for "Day by Day" was held on July 7, 2012, on Music Core, which was backed by a 70-person orchestra and featured the stage debut of the group's eighth member, Areum.

On July 25 and 26, T-ara held a concert in Japan, with Hwayoung only performing one song due to an alleged leg injury. After the concert, Hyomin took to Twitter and posted "There are differences in levels of determination. Let us have more determination", while the other members agreed, with Jiyeon posting "The differences in levels of determination ^^, Always be humble ^^ and sensible ^^ I applaud you, acting genius ^^". Subsequently, Hwayoung tweeted "Sometimes, even determination alone is not enough. At times like these, I feel upset but I trust that it's a blessing in disguise from the heavens. God, you know everything right?", while her sister Hyoyoung wrote "My better half is suffering. My heart hurts. No matter what anyone else says, (Hwayoung), you can get through this". This event caused Korean netizens to suspect that there was conflict between the group members. Netizens retweeted the messages and speculated that Hwayoung was being bullied, sparking a huge firestorm of controversy and backlash against the members. When the bullying controversy got out of hand, Core Contents Media abruptly announced Hwayoung's immediate departure on July 30, after being with the group for one year and eight months. CCM's CEO, Kim Kwang-soo, claimed that Hwayoung's contract was terminated because staff members felt her behavior was hurting teamwork, and that the bullying controversy was not the reason for her departure. By this point public opinion was almost universally in favor of Hwayoung, and the extreme negative reaction the other members received caused the group to temporarily suspend activities, although the members continued with their individual activities. At the time, both sides of the situation said that there was no bullying, only natural conflicts between the members.

It was later announced that there would be no changes to T-ara's upcoming comeback; however, their agency took the statement back and announced that their comeback would be postponed indefinitely. Their Day by Day extended play re-issue, Mirage, was eventually released on September 3, 2012. Two singles, "Sexy Love" and "Najgwa Bam (Love All)" ("Day and Night"), were released from the album on the same day, with "Sexy Love" peaking at number four on the Gaon charts and number three on the Billboard Korea K-pop Hot 100 charts. "Najgwa Bam (Love All)" was a collaboration single featuring T-ara's Areum with Gun-ji of Gavy NJ and Shannon.

On September 10, 2012, it was announced that the group would release a best of album in Japan consisting of all of their Korean singles to date (excluding "Day by Day" and "Sexy Love") in celebration of one year since their Japanese debut. The album was eventually released on October 10. On September 26, T-ara released the Japanese version of "Day by Day", which is mainly composed of scenes from their Korean music videos for that song. In October, T-ara released the Japanese version of "Sexy Love" and shortly after, the group departed to Japan to promote for their upcoming single.

In September 2012, T-ara was offered  in funding for an Asia tour including China, Hong Kong, Indonesia, Vietnam, Thailand, Singapore and Malaysia. With 20 stops, the tour was set with concerts in arenas with 10,000–20,000 seats adding up to over 150,000 in total attendance.

2013–2014: Subunits, Again, and And & End
T-ara released their sixth Japanese single  on March 20, 2013. The A-side "Bunny Style!" is their first single composed specifically for the Japanese market. The single was released in ten different editions each with a different B-side: seven regular editions that contain a solo song by one of the members, and three limited editions which contain a song performed by a sub-unit. To promote the single, the group held special showcases in 10 Japanese cities, starting on February 20, 2013, at the Sapporo Factory Atrium and ending on March 9, 2013, at the Seagull Square in Nagasaki. On April 1, 2013, T-ara's Japanese label, EMI Music Japan, was absorbed into Universal Music Japan, became defunct as a company and was renamed to EMI Records Japan. All of T-ara's further Japanese promotions were to be done through Universal Music Japan.

In early April 2013, it was announced that T-ara would be forming a sub-unit with members Eunjung, Hyomin, Jiyeon, and Areum called T-ara N4. This is a shortened form of 'T-ara Brand New 4', signifying the transformation of the four members. The sub-unit debuted on April 29, 2013, with the song "Jeon Won Diary" (전원일기), produced by Duble Sidekick. T-ara performed at the Nippon Budokan on July 13, 2013, to celebrate the release of their second Japanese album Treasure Box due August 7, 2013. The title for Treasure Box was revealed on June 15, 2013, along with the album's track list of thirteen songs. T-ara released the music video "Painkiller" as a digital single song. The song was a collaboration with T-ara, Davichi, See Ya, 5dolls and Speed. Jiyeon appeared as the main character in the music video.

On July 10, 2013, it was confirmed with a video released by Core Contents Media that Areum would be leaving the group to pursue a solo career "towards the beginning of next year". In August, T-ara released the music video "Bikini" featuring Davichi and Skull. At their Budokan Concert, it was announced that Qri would be the new leader of T-ara. On September 15, Core Contents Media announced that T-ara would hold their long-awaited Korean comeback on October 10. Before their comeback, T-ara, together with Davichi, SPEED and The SeeYa held a concert in Mongolia, which attracted a crowd of 20,000 people. On October 6, T-ara performed "Number 9" for the first time at "Hallyu Dream Concert" along with "Sexy Love". "Number Nine" was released with T-ara's mini album Again on October 10. T-ara also released a Japanese album to promote a Japanese movie, Jinx, featuring Hyomin named Kioku ~Kimi ga Kureta Michishirube~, in November. The album was released according to the date on which the movie will premiere.

T-ara had a Korean comeback on December 2 with the song "Do You Know Me". Their concept for this comeback and music video according to theater concept with retro style. They also release a repackage album named Again 1977 which contains the best songs from their album, Again. The group also released a ballad version of "Do You Know Me". On December 13, T-ara released a Christmas song, "Hide & Seek". T-ara was ranked seventh as the group with most number one hit songs on digital music charts in the past decade with 13 songs, despite debuting 4.5 years ago. On January 19, T-ara had their second concert in Chengdu, China, one out of five concerts they planned to stage China in 2014. On February 14, T-ara held a joint concert with label-mates Speed in Phnom Penh, Cambodia. On the 19th of February CCM released a music video for a promotional track from Cho Young Soo's All Star Project with the single titled as "First Love" sung by Hyomin, Jiyeon and Soyeon featuring rapper EB. T-ara had a Japanese comeback with the double A-side single "Lead The Way" and "LA'booN" on March 5, and their third Japanese album Gossip Girls was released on May 14.

On September 11, T-ara's sixth mini album And & End was released along with two music videos for the title track, "Sugar Free". The song was inspired by EDM and is part of the Big Room subgenre of electro house music. On September 24, a remix album was released called EDM CLUB Sugar Free Edition. This album included an English version of "Sugar Free", which was the first song T-ara had recorded in English. On October 13, T-ara signed a management contract with influential Chinese entertainment company, Longzhen Culture Development. The contract worth 5 billion KRW (~US$4.8 million). On November 24, T-ara released a Korean/Chinese cover of "Little Apple" by Chopstick Brothers, as well as a music video. This video featured Jiyeon, Eunjung, Qri, and Hyomin, as well as Seunghee from F-ve Dolls and Dani. The video hit ́8 millions views within two days on website Tudou. On December 25, T-ara held their first domestic concert named "Dear My Family" at COEX Auditorium in Samseongdong, Seoul. In order to be close with fans and spend a meaningful time with them, the concert was small with 1100 seats. On December 27, T-ara held their concert in Shanghai as the beginning stop of their 2013–2014 China tour.

2015–2016: So Good and Remember
After their first concert in Korea, T-ara headed to Vietnam for a Mini Concert. On January 9, the group arrived at the airport, where problems occurred which resulted in scheduling changes. Nevertheless, the group's mini-concert, which took place on October 10, drew in more than 3000 Vietnamese and International Fans.

On February 7, 2015, MBK Entertainment debuted a project group known as "TS" with the artists Eunjung, Soyeon, Cho Seunghee, Minkyung (The SeeYa), Ki-O, Jongkook and Sejun (SPEED). The group released a winter single, titled "Don't Forget Me."

In March 2015, it was announced that T-ara would be the main performer for Malaysia's Sultan Of Johor Coronation celebrations in Johor Bahru. The group will appear at the event alongside Sistar and The Black Eyed Peas' Taboo, which attracted 50,000 audience.

On June 20, 2015, T-ara began their first China tour, Great China Tour started from Nanjing, Beijing and Hefei. It was the first concert held by T-ara after signing with their new agency Banana Plan, who manages their Chinese promotions. The group performed 22 songs and sold out 4,000 tickets. The next concert on their Great China Tour was held in Guangzhou on December 19, and sold more than 5,000 tickets – making it the second consecutive sold-out concert on the tour.

On July 17, 2015, MBK Entertainment confirmed that the group will join the summer comeback lineup in the first week of August. On August 3, 2015, T-ara's seventh extended plays, So Good with title track "So Crazy" was released. It was composed by Brave Brothers, the composer of Hyomin's solo debut title track "Nice Body", and surpassed 1 million views in 2 days.

On August 13, T-ara held a press conference for their web-drama "Sweet Temptation" which features a total of 6 episodes for 6 separate stories. The drama was released in October 2015.

On October 15, the website "Insider Monkey" published a list of 16 best selling girl groups of all time where T-ara was placed 10th with a total of 36.18 million sales recorded. The group then appeared on season 3 of Chinese game show The Brain, making them the 2nd Korean act to appear on this show after Kim Soo-hyun, who visited the show during season 1.

On June 4, T-ara participated alongside other artists at the Dream Concert 2016. The group's performance was a remix of "Bo Peep Bo Peep", "Roly Poly" and "So Crazy", which was well received by the public.

As of 2016, the Dong-a Ilbo newspaper has published many items on the Korean idol stars who have had influence in the last 20 years based on a poll of 2,000 people in Korea. In the category "Top 14 Favorite Songs", T-ara ranked 14th with the song "Roly-Poly".

On September 9, T-ara performed three songs for the IASGO in Seoul. 
On September 11, T-ara flew to Japan for their Tokyo Fan-meeting. The "Premium Live Concert" was held the Tokyo Dome City Hall where T-ara performed seven songs and talked to their fans. T-ara performed twice during the day as the event was divided into two parts, one in the afternoon and the other in the evening. T-ara performed their song "Memories" for the first time live.

On September 17, T-ara held their last Concert for their Great China Tour at the Mercedes-Benz Arena in Shanghai with around 8500 people attending.

On September 29 was the first broadcast of the new Variety Show "Master of Driving" with Hyomin and Eunjung as part of the cast. The show consists of 3 experimented celebrity drivers who will give them driving lessons.

T-ara participated in the Busan One Asia Festival 2016 on the opening performance on October 1. They also took part in Kpop concert on October 4 and performed 8 different songs, with many Chinese and international fans attending and cheering them on.
Following their appearance, T-ara flew to Jeju to perform at the Jeju Olleh Duty Free Shop Concert on the 9th and performed five songs such as "Sexy Love" or "I don't want you".

In October 2016, MBK Entertainment announced that T-ara would be releasing a mini-album produced by Duble Sidekick in November. T-ara's eighth extended play, Remember, with lead single TIAMO was released on November 9. The release was followed by three fan-signing events.

2017–2019: End of the bullying controversy, What's My Name? and hiatus
In February 2017, Hwayoung and her twin sister Hyoyoung appeared on tvN's reality show Live Talk Show Taxi and spoke about the controversy again. Despite Hwayoung having initially claimed that there was no bullying, she now described the situation as having been "hated" and bullied by the other members, how hard everything had been for her and how her sister was the only person who had supported her during the incident. Shortly after the interview aired, a former staff member stepped forwards and alleged that it had actually been the twins who had "bullied" the other members, and released texts that appeared to show Hyoyoung threatening former member Areum with physical harm for not supporting Hwayoung's behavior. Soon afterwards, more and more staff members came forward with evidence that Hwayoung had been disrespectful to the other members as well as stylists and had faked how severe her initial injury was in order to get more sympathy. Hwayoung initially tried to deny the rumors, lashing out at the staffers in return, but eventually admitted that the texts were real. After suffering from an intense backlash, including being removed from several television shows, Hwayoung deleted her Instagram account.

On March 6, 2017, MBK Entertainment announced that T-ara will be releasing their final album in May, with Soyeon and Boram terminating their contracts after its release. Qri, Eunjung, Hyomin, and Jiyeon were to stay with the label until December 31, 2017. On May 7, MBK Entertainment revealed the group's plans had changed, and that the final album had been rescheduled to release in June 2017, with members Boram and Soyeon not being able to partake due to the expiry of their contracts. On May 8, it was announced that T-ara's last performance as six-members will be in Taiwan concert on May 13.

The remaining four members continued as a group with releasing their ninth extended play and last promotional album What's My Name? on June 14, 2017. After a five-year period without receiving any awards on music shows, T-ara won first place on The Show on June 20.

T-ara has released track "My Love" on July 15 for KBS 2TV's drama Greatest One-Shot.

On November 4, the group held their first concert in Ho Chi Minh city, Vietnam, which reportedly attracted 10,000 attendees. A portion of the ticket sales would be donated to charity in Vietnam in honor of the 25th anniversary of diplomatic relations between Vietnam and South Korea.

On January 3, 2018, Hyomin took to her Instagram account to announce that she, Jiyeon, Eunjung, and Qri had decided to not renew their contracts with MBK, thus leaving the company. The company later confirmed that the group had left the company but did not state that the group had disbanded. MBK Entertainment later confirmed that they had registered a trademark for T-ara on December 28. The members officially filed documentation outlining grounds for rejection of MBK Entertainment's trademark on January 19. On August 8, MBK Entertainment trademarks for T-ara had been denied by the Trademark Act.

2020–present: Reunion and comeback
On October 2, 2020, T-ara held a single reunion performance in the televised Chuseok of the SBS online variety program MMTG, performing "Roly-Poly" and "Sexy Love".

In July 2021, T-ara reunited again with an appearance on JTBC's Knowing Bros.  On July 29, it was announced through the group's 12th anniversary livestream that they would be making their first comeback in four years before the winter of 2021. Released in collaboration with Dingo Music, the group made their long-awaited comeback with the single album Re:T-ara on November 15, 2021.  The album consists of two tracks: "All Kill" and "Tiki Taka".  On November 21, the group held the fan meeting "T-ARA 2021 FAN PARTY".

On April 22, 2022, T-ara performed and guest-starred as a group again on JTBC's Famous Singers 2.

Members
Jiae and Jiwon left the group in 2009, prior to debut due to creative differences. Boram, Qri, and Soyeon were added to the group shortly before debut single, "Lie". Hwayoung joined the group on July 26, 2010, thus making T-ara a seven-member group. Core Contents Media announced on May 30, 2012, that a new member named Dani would join the group following the completion of her training, and one month later, Areum joined T-ara.

Following the bullying controversy, CCM announced that Hwayoung's contract was to be terminated. On July 10, 2013, T-ara returned to its original debut lineup after Areum left to start a solo career. T-ara then continued as a six-member group until Core Contents Media (now under MBK) announced that Soyeon and Boram were leaving the group.

Leader timeline

Sub-unit

T-ara N4

On April 12, 2013, Core Contents Media announced the launch of the group's first sub-unit, T-ara N4, standing for "T-ara Brand New 4", consisting of four members: Jiyeon, Eunjung, Hyomin, and Areum. T-ara had previously tried sub-units with the promotions of their sixth Japanese single "Bunny Style!", in which the B-sides were sung by units of two and three members; however, this was their first time doing formal unit activities. The group's debut song, "Jeon Won Diary" (Jeon-won Ilgi), was inspired by the 1980s drama of the same name. Produced by Duble Sidekick, it is a "funky and intense" dance song with elements of hip-hop. with the main motif of "Jeon Won Diary" being about breaking away from the same everyday routine. T-ara N4's extended play, Jeon Won Diary, and the music video for the title track were released on April 29, 2013.

QBS

A Japanese sub-unit called QBS was announced in May 2013, featuring members Qri, Boram and Soyeon. The group focused on the Japanese market. The sub-unit released their debut single "Kaze no You ni" (Like the Wind) on June 26, 2013. Written and composed by Takanori Fukuta, the song is described as a refreshing pop tune with an evergreen melody that leaves a "lasting impression". To promote the single, QBS held a live show at the Sunshine City Fountain Square in Ikebukuro, Tokyo on June 10, 2013. The group performed "Kaze no Yō ni", along with Boram and Qri's  and Soyeon's "Love Poem" from their "Bunny Style!" single, in front of 2,000 fans.

Legacy 
Recognized for their diversity, T-ara became known for shifting styles and genres which earned them the title "chameleon of the music industry". In 2021, Aedan Juvat of Pop Wrapped praised their newest b-side track "All Kill" and included it in the magazine's "Top 21 Kpop Songs of 2021" descriping them as the "Second-generation K-pop legends" who "have offered fans some of the catchiest dance tracks in a decade". In June 2021, Clara Ribeiro from Pop Matters credited T-ara for bringing disco to K-pop with their second mini album John Travolta Wannabe and calling them "a force to be reckoned with" and "Roly Poly" as "one of the catchiest K-pop songs ever made".

T-ara repeatedly appeared on Top 5 on "List of the most searched female artists on Google Korea starting from 2010.

On March 30, 2022, rookie boy group NINE.i selected T-ara as a role model at their first album's release showcase.

Endorsements
T-ara has been an in-demand CF model since before their debut, In July 2009, a few days before debut, T-ara's agency CCM revealed that the group received a total of seven CF offers including from beverages, clothing, telecommunication, and teen cosmetics brands.

In October 2009, the group signed a contract for their first commercial-film with Nonghyup Apples. T-ara also filmed a CF for Nene Chicken in 2009 with comedian and public figure Yoo Jae-suk.

In February, T-ara was chosen to film a CF with Supernova for Guesto; one of the largest restaurant chains in Japan with 1,000 stores nationwide for about $1,000,000 each. About 140 Japanese media officials, including TBS TV, participated in the contract signing press conference.

In 2010, the group modeled for such companies as Mentholatum Korea, Tedin Water Parks, and Olympus cameras.  T-ara was chosen to model for Tedin Waterpark again in 2011.

In 2011, T-ara modeled in commercial films for sports brand Spris, electronics brand iRiver, software company Windysoft, optical store Look Optical, instant noodles brand Shin Ramyun, Crown Mountain and many others. The same year, T-ara was chosen as the new advertisement models for cosmetics brand Tony Moly. The group was expected to model for the brand in not only South Korea, but China, Japan, and other Asian countries as well.
T-ara is also the first idol group to sign a contract with online shopping mall Hi-Mart.

In February 2012, T-ara became models for the chicken chain Brilliant Chicken for over US$1 Million; reportedly the highest figure ever proposed to a Korean Idol.

In early 2015, T-ara reportedly signed a US$1 million contract with Celucasn, a Chinese popular clothing brand with images and a short promotional video also having already been released. In November, T-ara became spokesperson for Chinese server of a multiplayer game World of Warships and released the Chinese version of "Cry Cry" as the official theme song. The group also became the face of the mobile game Dream of the Three Kingdoms.

In 2016, the group became brand ambassadors in Vietnam for Pantech Korea as the company was launching new phone models.

Ambassadorships 
In October 2009, T-ara became the ambassador for the "2009 Apple Day Event" in which they performed their commercial song "Apple Is A" on October 22 held at Cheonggye Plaza in Seoul. By December 2009, T-ara were the official ambassador for both "Busan Science Museum" and the Japanese anime 'Evangelion: Breaking' for which SS501 were previously models for.

In June 2011, T-ara along with girl group 4minute were appointed as public relations ambassadors for "National Sharing Movement" by the Korean Ministry of Health and Welfare. The two groups attended the appointment ceremony on June 14 held at Seoul Plaza in Jung-gu, Seoul.

In August 2011, T-ara were appointed as honorary public relations ambassadors for "2011 Gyeonggi Functional Game Festival". Members Qri and Boram represented the group by attending the appointment ceremony on August 31 where they received a plaque of appreciation by Gyeonggi Province governor Choi Chan-heung. Over 150 companies will participate in exhibitions and export consultations for the event's third edition.

In November 2015, T-ara was appointed ambassadors in respect of the establishment of business partnership between Hankyung Media Group and Sina Weibo. The group attended the "2015 Hallyu Center Awards" and received the Hallyu Envoy Award.

Other ventures

Café "Page One" 
T-ara launched their own café franchise called Cafe Page One that will expand into a chain of 500 nationwide stores. The name of their café was influenced from the cafe that member Eunjung ran in her drama Coffee House. Cafe Page One was opened on July 1, 2011, where the members were present to greet the customers. An alternate version of the song featuring vocals from original singer SG Wannabe, Ock Joo Hyun and T-ara's So-yeon was released along with a music video of T-ara on the cafe's opening day. A special limited photobook was released celebrating the opening, and it was only given to a limited number of fans who attended the opening.

T-ara Dotcom 
In 2010, T-ara launched their own online shopping mall named "T-ara Dotcom" (T-ara.com). The project was a huge success exceeding 600M Won in monthly revenue. It recorded an average 500,000 daily visitors and more than 20 million won in daily sales as of June 2010 becoming the third most successful shopping malls run by a celebrity in a short period. T-ara acted as models for the mall since its opening. The store was also given its own TV show  aired in February 2010.

In June, 2010, Core Contents Media revealed that all proceeds from all of T-ara's World Cup-related products will be donated in support of catering establishments in undeveloped areas of Africa.

Mobile apps 
Since their debut, T-ara has release several mobile apps from games to info-apps.

In April 2012, T-ara released "T-ara Shake", a mobile game featuring T-ara's songs. It was a commercial success topping App store's top grossing apps chart for days.

In September 2012, T-ara released "T-ara 3D" to promote their comeback with "Sexy Love". According to Core Contents Media "T-ara 3D"  was created after a two-month production period in collaboration with app developer Sunshinez. It featured member profiles, 3D images, photos, videos, news & notices, and schedules. The app was on sale on Google's Google Play Android Market and was later released on Apple App Store.

In 2014, T-ara released their first info-app "T-ara Holic". T-ara's upcoming schedule, activities, music and products were available on the app. In June 2014, T-ara's Hyo-min's self-designed t-shirts were made available exclusively on "T-ara Holic". All products were sold-out within 24 hours.

Philanthropy
On December 22, 2009, T-ara announced that they donated 100 boxes of ramen purchased with their CF appearance fee and 50 packs of toilet paper recently received as a gift from a toilet paper company to JTS, a private international organization for hunger disease literacy.

In January 2010, T-ara donated  (~$10,000) to Haiti victims after the earthquake disaster. T-ara used all their variety program fees for the donation. In addition, T-ara held a fundraising event in the Jamsil Gymnasium in Seoul along with other artists like SG Wannabe. The said event was in hopes of gathering a larger amount of money from stars. Producers from several other companies also attended the event.

In June, 2010, Core Contents Media revealed that all proceeds from all of T-ara's World Cup-related products sold on their online shopping mall "T-ara Dotcom" will be donated in support of catering establishments in undeveloped areas of Africa.

On March 11, 2012, T-ara announced through their company's representative that they donated all their profits from their latest Japanese single Roly Poly to the victims of the Fukushima nuclear power plant accident. In October of the same year, T-ara donated part of their performance fee to a local Korean school in Malayasia. In July, T-ara donated 0.73 tons of rice received ahead of their first fan meeting in Korea to underprivileged children and other neighbors in need.

In February 2013, T-ara donated 100 sacks of rice to an orphanage in Bucheon ahead of the Lunar New Year holiday. On December 14 of the same year, the group held a charity event in Eunjung's mother's cafe, Cafenne. T-ara's old clothing, stage costumes and donations from Davichi, Ha Seokjin, Hwang Jungeum and Son Hojun were to be auctioned off. On the 27th, T-ara donated the remaining  (~$10,000) to the Sharing Campaign "Hope Windmill" organized by the Red Cross by directly visiting the event. T-ara said, "We are able to end the year with a warm heart thanks to the many people who took part in the charity event and we give thanks to those who helped T-ara take the steps necessary for it."

In September 2014, T-ara members donated 1,500 kg of rice "Dongducheon Angel" Movement. Hyomin, Qri and Boram personally delivered the donation to "Dongducheon Angel" Headquarters and held an additional fan-sign event to celebrate the Chuseok holiday.

Discography

Absolute First Album (2009)
Jewelry Box (2012)
Treasure Box (2013)
Gossip Girls (2014)

Concerts

Published works
 Sparkle (2012) Tokyo: Gentosha, 2012. . Shot by Shin Yamagishi.
 T-ara Private Book (2013) Tokyo: Kodansha, 2013. .

Filmography

Awards and nominations

See also
 T-ara videography
 List of songs recorded by T-ara
 List of best-selling girl groups

Notes

References

External links

  

 
Articles which contain graphical timelines
2009 establishments in South Korea
Japanese-language singers of South Korea
K-pop music groups
MBK Entertainment artists
Universal Music Japan artists
Musical groups established in 2009
Musical groups from Seoul
South Korean dance music groups
South Korean girl groups
Musical groups disestablished in 2017
South Korean synthpop groups
Melon Music Award winners
Musical groups reestablished in 2020